Slack Alice may refer to:

 An imaginary friend of comedian Larry Grayson and title of the B-side of his August 1972 single, "Shut That Door"
 A Manchester nightclub opened by footballer George Best in 1973
 A 1973 British band (1973) fronted by Sandra Barry

See also 
 Northumberlandia, a sculpture nicknamed "Slag Alice"